The Dornier Do 231 was a VTOL transport aircraft project developed by Dornier.

Design and development 
The Do 231 was a result of a design competition, conducted in the early 1970s by the German Federal Ministry of Economics, to create a 100-person VTOL aircraft. Based on the earlier Do 31, the Do 231 was to have shoulder-mounted cantilever swept wings and a T-tail.

The 1973 oil crisis rendered the Do 231 proposal as uneconomical due to the high fuel consumption necessary for vertical takeoff and landing, and the aircraft was cancelled in 1976 without a single prototype being built.

Variants 
Do 231C
Commercial variant for Lufthansa with a capacity of 100 passengers.
Do 231M
Military variant with a stretched fuselage and a rear loading ramp.

Specifications (Do 231C)

See also

References

Do 231
V/STOL aircraft by thrust vectoring
1970s German experimental aircraft
Abandoned military aircraft projects of Germany
1970s German aircraft
Aircraft with auxiliary jet engines
High-wing aircraft